Ion Sumedrea (born 15 April 1925) is a Romanian cross-country skier who competed in the 1950s. He finished 23rd in the 50 km event at the 1952 Winter Olympics in Oslo. He was born in Fundata, Brașov County.

External links
Olympic 50 km cross country skiing results: 1948-64
  

1925 births
Possibly living people
Romanian male cross-country skiers
Olympic cross-country skiers of Romania
Cross-country skiers at the 1952 Winter Olympics
People from Brașov County